Caloboletus is a fungal genus in the family Boletaceae. It was circumscribed by Italian mycologist Alfredo Vizzini with Caloboletus calopus as the type species. The erection of Caloboletus follows recent molecular studies that outlined a new phylogenetic framework for the Boletaceae. Boletus peckii was also transferred to this genus by Vizzini, but was subsequently moved to the genus Butyriboletus based on molecular evidence. The generic name Caloboletus, derived from the Greek calos "nice", refers to the attractive red coloring of the stipe.

Species
Caloboletus calopus (Pers.) Vizzini (2014)
Caloboletus conifericola Vizzini (2014)
Caloboletus firmus (Frost) Vizzini (2014)
Caloboletus frustosus (Snell & E.A.Dick) D.Arora & J.L.Frank (2014)
Caloboletus guanyui N.K. Zeng, H. Chai & S. Jiang (2019)
Caloboletus inedulis (Murrill) Vizzini (2014)
Caloboletus kluzakii (Šutara & Špinar) Vizzini (2014)
Caloboletus marshii D.Arora, C.F.Schwarz & J.L.Frank (2014) – United States
Caloboletus panniformis (Taneyama & Har.Takah.) Vizzini (2014)
Caloboletus polygonius (A.E.Hills & Vassiliades) Vizzini (2014)
Caloboletus radicans (Pers.) Vizzini (2014)
Caloboletus roseipes (Bessette, Both & A.R.Bessette) Vizzini (2014)
Caloboletus rubripes  (Thiers) Vizzini (2014)
Caloboletus xiangtoushanensis  Ming Zhang, T.H. Li & X.J. Zhong (2017)
Caloboletus yunnanensis Kuan Zhao & Zhu L.Yang (2014)

References

 
Boletales genera